The following are the national records in Olympic weightlifting in Ecuador. Records are maintained in each weight class for the snatch lift, clean and jerk lift, and the total for both lifts by the Federación Ecuatoriana de Levantamiento de Pesas.

Men

Women

References

Ecuador
records
Olympic weightlifting
weightlifting